Events in the year 1985 in Switzerland.

Incumbents
Federal Council:
Pierre Aubert (President)
Leon Schlumpf
Alphons Egli
Rudolf Friedrich
Otto Stich
Jean-Pascal Delamuraz (1983–1998)
Elisabeth Kopp (1984–1989)

Events
  19-20 November - Geneva Summit

Births
  2 February - Julian Bühler, Swiss football striker

References

 
Years of the 20th century in Switzerland
1980s in Switzerland